There are over 9,000 Grade I listed buildings in England. This page is a list of these buildings in the district of Breckland in Norfolk.

List of buildings

|}

See also
 Grade I listed buildings in Norfolk
 Grade I listed buildings in Broadland
 Grade I listed buildings in Great Yarmouth
 Grade I listed buildings in King's Lynn and West Norfolk
 Grade I listed buildings in North Norfolk
 Grade I listed buildings in Norwich
 Grade I listed buildings in South Norfolk
Grade II* listed buildings in Breckland

Notes

External links

Lists of Grade I listed buildings in Norfolk
Grade I listed buildings in Norfolk